The Adventures of Black Beauty is a British adventure family television series produced by London Weekend Television and shown by ITV in the United Kingdom between 1972 and 1974. It was distributed internationally by London Weekend International.

The New Adventures of Black Beauty (1990–91) was a continuation of the 1970s series, and was set at the beginning of the 20th century, twenty years after the original series.

Broadcast history
Two series were produced, the first airing from September 1972 to March 1973 and the second from September 1973 to March 1974. Although it was mainly aimed at children, it was shown in the Sunday teatime family timeslot and gained a wide audience, becoming popular enough to make the general Top 20 ratings. It was repeated regularly, although often on a regional basis, for many years, its last full repeat run being on Sunday mornings from 1986 to 1988 (a further repeat run was planned for the summer of 1990, but cancelled because of objections by Equity after repeat fees had not been re-negotiated). Having been shown in several major US markets when it was initially produced, it also aired in the United States on Nickelodeon in the 1980s. In July 2009, Retro Television Network picked up all 104 episodes of The Adventures of Black Beauty and The New Adventures of Black Beauty, and affiliates began airing the show, listing both shows as simply Black Beauty.

Plot
The series was not an adaptation of the 1877 book by Anna Sewell, but rather a "continuation" featuring new characters created by Ted Willis, most prominently Dr James Gordon, played by William Lucas, and his children Vicky, played by Judi Bowker (who became Jenny, played by Stacy Dorning, in the second series) and Kevin, played by Roderick Shaw (at the beginning of the New Adventures it is mentioned that Kevin had gone to sea and become a midshipman). Supporting characters included Dr. Gordon's loyal housekeeper Amy Winthrop, played by Charlotte Mitchell, and a local boy, Albert Clifton, portrayed by Tony Maiden. Other writers for the series included David Butler and Richard Carpenter, while directors included Charles Crichton and Peter Duffell. The series, which was filmed mainly at Stockers Farm, Rickmansworth, Hertfordshire.

Main cast
Dr. James Gordon – William Lucas (52 episodes, 1972–1974)
Amy Winthrop – Charlotte Mitchell (52 episodes, 1972–1974)
Kevin Gordon – Roderick Shaw (51 episodes, 1972–1974)
Squire Armstrong – Michael Culver (31 episodes, 1972–1974)
Vicky Gordon – Judi Bowker (26 episodes, 1972–1973)
Jenny Gordon – Stacy Dorning (25 episodes, 1973–1974)
Police Constable Dickins – Kenneth Thornett (16 episodes, 1972–1974)
Albert Clifton – Tony Maiden (14 episodes, 1972–1974)
Ned Lewis – Stephen Garlick (11 episodes, 1973–1974)

Episodes
Transmission dates given are for the network; they varied in London.

Series 1 (1972–73)

Series 2 (1973–74)

Theme tune
The theme tune, "Galloping Home", was written by Denis King and performed by the London String Chorale. In 1973 it won the Ivor Novello Award for Best Theme Tune. It was also released as a single and peaked at number 31 in the UK charts in the week of 2 February 1974.

It was later used at the climax of the first series of Absolutely Fabulous, with Edina Monsoon dreaming of running through a field as Black Beauty does in the series' title sequence. The theme tune was also featured in the series Brainiac: Science Abuse. It actually has lyrics by Dick Vosburgh as revealed by Denis King at a memorial concert for Vosburgh in July 2007.

The theme was also used in 1975, in an episode of The Goodies called 'Scatty Safari', when the team release the main attraction of their Star Safari Park, Tony Blackburn, into the wild. It was also used in the final episode of the first series of BBC TV comedy I'm Alan Partridge. Alan exclaims "It's brilliant" upon hearing the piece when his PA Lynn puts it on the stereo; they then listen to it again when clearing up after Alan's unsuccessful leaving party. On disc 2 of the I'm Alan Partridge Series 1 DVD release, the theme music also plays on a loop over the menu, the background of which is a picture of Alan Partridge running through a field. The tune was also used as the opening theme of Finnish comedy series Studio Julmahuvi.

Video releases
Over the years there have been a number of VHS video releases of episodes (both single episode and 2 episode volumes and both PAL and NTSC format) by The Fremantle Corporation (with London Weekend Television/Talbot TV), VCI, Video Gems., and WH Smith Video. Sony is often cited as the producer of videos released by The Fremantle Corporation, but it appears that the name Sony, the manufacturer of the cassette, was retained on the slip cases.

In 2001, Network entered the series tentatively into the DVD market with two "best of" DVDs, one for each season. A few days later, these DVDs were available as a two disc set. The DVDs were released as region 0, but being PAL format were not suitable for the North American market. (Note: They released "The Best of Series One" on VHS first on 11 Jun 2001. "The Best of Series Two" followed in VHS on 13 Aug 2001.)

In 2007, Network offered the complete Season 1 as a 4 disc set in region 2. A few months later in 2008, Season 2 was released, also 4 discs and region 2. In 2009, these were combined and released as the complete series.

In 2008, Network released an anomalous offering of a DVD that included "The Recruiting Sergeant" (Season 1) and both parts of "Member of the Family" (Season 2), all of which had been part of their earlier "Best Of" DVDs. These were region 2 only.

In 2009 Image Entertainment released first Season 1 and then Season 2 in Region 1. Each season was three discs.

In 2012 Madacy Entertainment and Image Entertainment released The Best of Black Beauty a 10 disc Region 1 box set containing 42 episodes of The Adventures of Black Beauty and 44 episodes of The New Adventures of Black Beauty.

The Adventures of Black Beauty episodes included in The Best of Black Beauty are:

Season 1 - 1 episode omitted
Disc 1: The Fugitive, The Pit Pony, Man Trap, The Hostage, The Horse Thieves, Warhorse, Clown on Horseback
Disc 2: The Duel, The Viking Helmet (Part 1), The Viking Helmet (Part 2), The Barge, Day of Reckoning, The Horse Dealer, The Debt, Runaway, Three Lock to Fortune
Disc 3: Recruiting Sergeant, The Ruffians, The Witch, Two of a Kind, The Ponies, Father and Son, Wild Justice, Foul Play, Sailor on a Horse

Season 2 - 9 episodes omitted
Disc 4: A Member of the Family (Part 1), A Member of the Family (Part 2), The Outcast, Good Neighbours, Mission of Mercy, Battle of Wills, The Medicine Man, Out of the Night
Disc 5: A Long Hard Run, The Horse Breaker, The Last Roundup, Goodbye Beauty, The Escape, A Ribbon for Beauty, The Last Charge, Race against Time, Game of Chance

For the rest of the episodes in this box set, see The New Adventures of Black Beauty.

References

External links

Screenonline entry

1972 British television series debuts
1974 British television series endings
1970s British drama television series
ITV television dramas
ITV children's television shows
British television shows based on children's books
Period family drama television series
Television series by Fremantle (company)
Black Beauty
Television series about horses
Television series by ITV Studios
English-language television shows
London Weekend Television shows
1970s British children's television series